Deb Cherry (born August 19, 1954) is a former Democratic member of the Michigan Senate, representing the 26th district until she was elected Genesee County treasurer in 2010. Her district included parts of Genesee and Oakland counties. Previously she was a member of the Michigan House of Representatives from 1995 to 2000. Her brother John D. Cherry was the Lieutenant Governor of Michigan. There was speculation that she may run for congress in 2012.

Background
Cherry received a Bachelor of Science degree from Oakland University and earned a Master of Public Administration from University of Michigan-Flint.

Political career
Cherry's interest in politics began in high school when she joined a non-partisan student group. Since that time she has been active in politics as a volunteer, manager of campaigns, as a candidate, and as an elected official. Before being elected into the legislature, Cherry worked with the Valley Area Agency on Aging where she managed grants and worked to find funding for various agency services. She also served on the Genesee County Commission for six years, where she represented the 3rd District, and was Commission Chair for 3 years. Cherry is currently Chairman of the Greater Flint Health Coalition, a member of the Michigan Fitness foundation, the Michigan Prospect and IMA Board, as well as is an honorary member of the Genesee County Board.

References

External links
Senator Cherry's Homepage
The Cherry Report with guest Linda Hamacher
Floor Statements video clips
Project Vote Smart - Senator Deborah Cherry (MI) profile
Follow the Money - Deborah Cherry
2006 2004 2002 2000 1998 1996 campaign contributions
Michigan Senate Democratic Caucus
Michigan Liberal - SD26
Blogging for Michigan Sen. Cherry: Michigan Kids, Legislature Both Need to Shape Up

Democratic Party Michigan state senators
Democratic Party members of the Michigan House of Representatives
1954 births
Living people
County treasurers in Michigan
County commissioners in Michigan
Oakland University alumni
University of Michigan–Flint alumni
People from Dowagiac, Michigan
Women state legislators in Michigan
20th-century American politicians
20th-century American women politicians
21st-century American politicians
21st-century American women politicians